Bill Robens is a Los Angeles-based playwright, screenwriter and actor, whose written works include The Poseidon Adventure: the Musical (co-written with Genemichael Barrera), The Towering Inferno: the Musical (co-written with Steve Marca), a comedy variety show, A Fish Without His Flippers and  A Mulholland Christmas Carol, which earned Bill an L.A. Weekly Theatre Award for Best Adaptation.

Career
Bill Robens began writing for the theatre shortly after becoming a member of Theatre of NOTE, a Los Angeles theatre company specializing in new plays. His first satirical piece, The Poseidon Adventure: the Musical (co-written with Genemichael Barrera), was independently produced, drawing large crowds and excellent reviews. Robens then wrote a holiday play, A Mulholland Christmas Carol, which was performed at Theatre of NOTE with great success during the Christmas season of 2002, ultimately becoming an annual holiday event. The Towering Inferno: the Musical (co-written with Steve Marca), and the comedy variety show A Fish Without His Flippers soon followed.

Bill Robens' critically acclaimed gumshoe satire Kill Me Deadly played to packed houses for the entirety of its thrice-extended 2009 inaugural run at Theatre of NOTE.

In 2009, Bill Roben's first feature film as a writer, Scream of the Bikini, directed by long-time collaborator Kiff Scholl, began playing the festival circuit.

In 2015, he adapted Kill Me, Deadly into a feature film of the same name.

References

External links
Connotation Press - interview with Bill Robens

Scream Of The Bikini - Official Website

Living people
American dramatists and playwrights
American male screenwriters
Writers from Los Angeles
Year of birth missing (living people)
Place of birth missing (living people)
Male actors from Los Angeles
American male dramatists and playwrights
Screenwriters from California